Hollis William Frampton, Jr. (March 11, 1936 – March 30, 1984) was an American avant-garde filmmaker, photographer, writer, theoretician, and pioneer of digital art. He was best known for his innovative and non-linear structural films that defined the movement, including Lemon (1969), Zorns Lemma (1970), and Hapax Legomena (1971–1972), as well as his anthology book, Circles of Confusion: Film, Photography, Video: Texts, 1968–1980 (1983).

Biography

Personal life
Hollis Frampton married Marcia Steinbrecher in September 1966. The couple separated in 1971 and divorced in 1974. He later married Marion Faller, a photographer whom he had met and began living with in early 1971.  Together, Frampton and Faller collaborated on several series including "Vegetable Locomotion" and "False Impressions". Frampton had a stepson by Faller named Will.

Early years
Frampton was born Hollis William Frampton, Jr. on March 11, 1936, in Wooster, Ohio to Nellie Cross Frampton and Hollis William Frampton. An only child, he was raised primarily by his maternal grandparents John and Fanny Cross. Fanny Cross is the subject of Frampton's 1979 film "Gloria!". At the age of 15 he entered Phillips Academy in Andover, Massachusetts,  where he was accepted on full scholarship. At Andover, Frampton’s classmates and friends included the painter Frank Stella and sculptor Carl Andre. Well read as a youth, he had a reputation at Andover as a “young genius” He failed to graduate from Andover, and thus forfeited a National Scholarship to Harvard University. He failed his final History exam on a bet that he could pass without ever reading the textbook. Entering Western Reserve University in 1954, Frampton took a variety of classes (Latin, Greek, German, French, Russian, Sanskrit, Chinese, mathematics) but had not declared a major. He recounted that when he was called in front of the dean after three and a half years of study and 135 hours of credits and asked, once again, if he intended to take a degree, he was told that if so, he needed to take speech, western civilization, and music appreciation. He replied that “I already know how to talk, I already know who Napoleon was and I already like music”  and noted that “For that reason I hold no bachelor's degree. I was very sick of school." During this time he had a short-lived radio show on WOBC at Oberlin College.

Ezra Pound – Washington D.C. and New York
In 1956, Frampton began correspondence with Ezra Pound after becoming interested in the literary generation of the 1880s. In the fall of 1957, he moved to Washington D.C. where he visited Ezra Pound almost daily at St. Elizabeth’s hospital where Pound was finishing part of his Cantos. There, Frampton writes that he was “privy to a most meaningful exposition of the poetic process by an authentic member of the ‘generation of the ‘80’s.’At the same time, I came to understand that I was not a poet.”  Early the next year, Frampton moved to New York. He renewed his friendships with Andre and Stella, sharing an apartment first with the two of them and then with Andre only. He began photographing artist friends; early projects included documentation of Andre’s work,The Secret World of Frank Stella 1958–1962, and portraits of artists such as Larry Poons and James Rosenquist.

Death and legacy
Frampton died of cancer on March 30, 1984, a few weeks after his 48th birthday.

His 1971 film (nostalgia), was inducted into the National Film Registry in 2003.

Film
As Frampton's photography moved toward exploring ideas of series and sets, he began to make films. He based a lot of his early films on concepts. All of his very early works were either discarded or lost.  His earliest surviving work is Information (1966).  His early works were reasonably simple in construction.  A few of them including Maxwell's Demon, Surface Tension, and Prince Rupert's Drops were based on concepts from science, a subject he was knowledgeable of. As he got on, his films gradually increased in scope and ambition. He was seen as a structural filmmaker, a style that focused on the nature of film itself.  In an interview with Robert Gardner he stated a discomfort with that term because it was too broad and didn't accurately reflect the nature of his work. Autumnal Equinox (1974) was shot inside a meat-packing plant, and shot using 30 mm film that contained bovine jelly.   

His most significant work is arguably Zorns Lemma (1970), a film which drastically altered perceptions towards experimental film at the time. It is formed in three different sections. The first is a reading (by Joyce Wieland) of the Bay State Primer, a puritan work for children to learn the alphabet. The sentences used had foreboding themes such as "In Adams fall, we sinned all." The second section is based on a text based work by Carl Andre, which started out with an alphabetical list of words for each letter in the alphabet. Each subsequent list is replaced with a letter until it is just letters. In Zorns Lemma, the concept is reversed. It starts off with a twenty four letter alphabet (I/J and U/V are considered one letter), each letter shown for one second of screentime and then looping. The second cycle replaces each letter with a word that starts with each letter. Gradually the word stills are replaced by an active film shot, such as washing hands or peeling a tangerine until there are only moving images. The third section contains a seemingly single shot of a couple walking across a snowy meadow. The sound is of six women reading one word at a time from Theory of Light. One interpretation of Zorns Lemma was that it was a comment on life's stages, the morality of the Bay State Primer being childhood, the sets of numbers representing maturing and interaction with the world, and the third part representing old age and death.  

After Zorns Lemma, he made the Hapax Legomena films, a series of seven films of which (nostalgia) is the most well known. Several of these films explored the relation between sound and cinema, an area often disregarded in American avant-garde film, by demonstrating a disjointed relationship between the two. Poetic Justice explores a "cinema of the mind", wherein the film takes place in the viewers' imagination(s) as they read title cards. An extremely rare artist book edition of Poetic Justice was printed by the Visual Studies Workshop. His final major film project was a monumental project called Magellan, named after the explorer who first circumnavigated the world. Magellan was intended to be shown as a calendrical cycle, one film for each day of the year. One film from the cycle, Magellan: Drafts and Fragments, is exemplary of Frampton's ambition to create a personal "meta-history" of film; in Drafts and fragments, he remade the cinema of the Lumieres in 51 1-minute films. 

The last few years of his life, Frampton taught at SUNY Buffalo, writing, working on Magellan and ongoing photographic projects with fellow artist and wife Marion Faller, and investigating the relationship between computers and art. He did some initial work with video and sound reproducing with an IMSAI 8080 computer.

Film study, restoration and print availability through Filmmakers Co-op NY, Anthology Film Archives and NY MoMA. Much of Frampton's work was released by the Criterion Collection on April 26, 2012 as special edition Blu-ray Disc and DVD. His archive is maintained by Anthology Film Archives and the Harvard Film Archive.

Filmography
Clouds Like White Sheep (1962) 25 min 16mm (reported destroyed)
A Running Man (1963) 22 min 16mm (reported destroyed)
Ten Mile Poem (1964) 33 min 16mm (reported destroyed)
Obelisk Ampersand Encounter (1965) 1:30 min 16mm (reported lost)
Information (1966) 4 min 16mm
Manual of Arms (1966) 17 min 16mm
Process Red (1966) 3:30 min 16mm
Heterodyne (1967) 7 min 16mm
Maxwell's Demon (1968) 4 min 16mm
Snowblind (1968) 5:30 min 16mm
Surface Tension (1968) 10 min 16mm
Artificial Light (1969) 25 min 16mm
Carrots and Peas (1969) 5:30 min 16mm
Lemon (1969) 7:30 min 16mm
Palindrome (1969) 22 min 16mm
Prince Rupert Drops (1969) 7 min 16mm
Work and Days (1969) 12 mins 16mm
States (1967, Revised 1970) 17:30 min 16mm
Zorns Lemma (1970) 60 minutes 16mm
Clouds of Magellan (1971) 16mm
Critical Mass (1971) 25:30 min 16mm
(nostalgia) (1971) 36 min 16mm
Travelling Matte (1971) 33:30 min 16mm
Appartus Sum (1972) 3 min 16mm
Given: . . . (1972) 28 min 16mm
Hapax Legomena (1971–1972) 3 hrs 22 min 16mm
Ordinary Matter (1972) 36 min 16mm
Poetic Justice (1972) 31:30 min 16mm
Public Domain (1972) 18 min 16mm
Remote Control (1972) 29 min 16mm
Special Effects (1972) 10:30 min 16mm
Tiger Balm (1972) 10 min 16mm
Yellow Springs (1972) 5 min 16mm
Less (1973) 1 sec 16mm	
Autumnal Equinox (Solariumagelani) (1974) 27 min 16mm
Banner (1974) 40 sec 16mm
INGENIVM NOBIS IPSA PVELLA FECIT (1974) 61:30 min 16mm
Noctiluca (Magellan's Toys: #1) (1974) 3:30 min 16mm
SOLARIUMAGELANI (1974) 92 min 16mm
Straits of Magellan (1974) 51:15 min 16mm
Summer Solstice (1974) 32 min 16mm	
Winter Solstice (1974) 33 min 16mm
Drum (1975) 20 sec 16mm
Pas de Trois (1975) 4 min 16mm
For Georgia O'Keeffe (1976) 3:30 min 16mm
Magellan: At the Gates of Death, Part I: The Red Gate (1976) 54 min 16mm
 A & B in Ontario (1984) 16 min
"Magellan: Drafts and Fragments"
"More Than Meets The Eye"
"Otherwise Unexplained Fires"

See also 
 Tony Conrad
 Paul Sharits
 Ernie Gehr
 George Landow a.k.a. Owen Land 
 Michael Snow, Canadian filmmaker and sculptor

Notes

References 
Goldensohn, Barry (1985), Memoir of Hollis Frampton, in Michelson, Annette, (ed.) Hollis Frampton: A Special Issue October, 32 MIT Press, Cambridge, Massachusetts  (pp. 7–16)
Jenkins, Bruce & Krane,Susan (1984), Hollis Frampton: Recollections-Recreations (p. 120) The MIT Press, Cambridge MA, 
Michelson, Annette, ed. (1985) Hollis Frampton: A Special Issue October, 32 MIT Press, Cambridge, Massachusetts

External links
Hollis Frampton

Anthology Film Archives Website
 
Hollis Frampton’s Notes from the Hollis Frampton Collection
Script for Hollis Frampton’s performance piece,A Lecture presented at Hunter College in New York on October 30, 1968
"Hollis" - a MUBI video essay about the filmmaker on official YouTube channel

1936 births
1984 deaths
American experimental filmmakers
Collage filmmakers
American photographers